Miss Teen Diva 2021 was the second edition of Miss Teen Diva beauty pageant. It was held on December 29, 2021, at Kingdom of Dreams in Gurugram, India. The event was hosted by Tanvi Malhara and Anisha Sharma. At the conclusion of the event, Mannat Siwach was crowned Miss Teen India International by outgoing titleholder, Rashi Parasrampuria. At the same event, Brunda Yerrabali was crowned Miss Teen India Universe, Rabia Hora was crowned Miss Teen India Earth and Mahika Biyani was crowned Miss Teen India Multinational. Along with that, two runners-up, Milan Kumari Panda (first runner-up) and Cherisha Chanda (second runner-up) were also crowned.

Results
Below are the names of the placement holders of Miss Teen Diva 2021 beauty pageant.

Sub Title Awards 
Below is the list of award winners.

Judges
Below are the names of the people who were part of the judging panel.
 Nikhil Anand - chairman and founder of Glamanand Group.
 Rajiv K Shrivastava - Director of Glamanand Group, President, Act Now, an NGO for environmental awareness, sustainability and peace 
 Zoya Afroz – Miss India International 2021.
 Tanya Sinha – Miss Globe International India 2021. 
 Asmita Chakroborty – Miss Tourism India 2021.

References

Beauty pageants in India
2021 beauty pageants